Philip Cook (July 4, 1875 – March 25, 1938) was bishop of the Episcopal Diocese of Delaware, serving from 1920 to 1938.

Biography
Cook was born in Kansas City, Missouri on July 4, 1875, son of John Darwin Shepherd Cook (1834-1909) and Rosalie Elvira Barlow (1838-1887). He was educated in the Kansas City public schools. He then studied at Trinity College in Hartford, Connecticut and graduated with a Bachelor of Arts in 1898. He also studied at the General Theological Seminary and graduated with a Bachelor of Divinity in 1902.

He was ordained deacon 1902 and priest on December 14, of the same year by Bishop Cameron D. Mann of North Dakota in Gethsemane Episcopal Cathedral (Fargo, North Dakota). Between 1903 and 1903, he served as a missionary in Towner, North Dakota, Rugby, North Dakota and Minot, North Dakota. In 1904 he was appointed assistant minister at the Chapel of the Incarnation in New York City, also serving as vicar of the chapel between 1908 and 1911. He then served as rector of St Mark's Church in San Antonio, Texas till 1916, after which he became rector of the Church of St Michael's and All Angels in Baltimore, Maryland.

On May 12, 1920, he was elected as Bishop of Delaware and was consecrated on October 14, 1920, by Presiding Bishop Daniel S. Tuttle. As Bishop of Delaware he represented the province of Washington in the National Council for two years; served as chairman of the Commission on the Ministry and was assessor to two Presiding Bishops, to Bishop Perry and to Bishop Tucker. He died in office on March 25, 1938.

References

1875 births
1938 deaths
People from Kansas City, Missouri
Trinity College (Connecticut) alumni
General Theological Seminary alumni
Episcopal bishops of Delaware